John Garang University (JGU) is a public university in the Republic of South Sudan.

Location
The university's main campus is located in the town of Bor, Jonglei State, on the banks of the White Nile River. The approximate coordinates of the main university campus are: 6° 13' 12.00"N, 31° 33' 0.00"E (Latitude: 6.220000; Longitude: 31.550000). The coordinates are approximate because the university campus does not yet show on most publicly available maps.

Overview
John Garang University is one of the seven (7) public universities in South Sudan. The list includes the following institutions:

 Alexandria University in Tonj
 Juba National University, in Juba
 Rumbek University in Rumbek
 Upper Nile University in Malakal and
 University of Bahr El-Ghazal in Wau
 University of Northern Bahr El-Ghazal in Aweil.

History
The university was founded in  February 2007, as the John Garang Institute of Science and Technology. The institute was elevated to university status in 2010.

Academics
, the university maintained five Colleges and one Institute, with plans for new ones to open in the future. The following Colleges are currently in operation:

 College of Agriculture
 College of Education
 College of Environmental Sciences
 College of Management Sciences
 College of Sciences and Technology
 Padak Institute of Fisheries

See also
Bor, South Sudan
Education in South Sudan
Greater Upper Nile
Jonglei State
List of universities in South Sudan

References

External links
Location of John Garang Memorial University At Google Maps

Universities in South Sudan
Educational organisations based in South Sudan
Jonglei State
Greater Upper Nile
Educational institutions established in 2006
Science and technology in South Sudan
2006 establishments in Sudan